Bohuslav "Bohuš" Keler (born 8 September 1961 in Karviná) is a Czech football manager and former player who played during most of his career for FC Vítkovice.

Club career
Keler played in 113 Czechoslovak First League matches for FC Vítkovice. In the 1985/1986 season he won the Czechoslovak First League with Vítkovice. Keler also had a spell with Le Havre AC in French Ligue 2. Keler scored twice in 17 matches during the inaugural season of the Gambrinus liga, where he played for FC Vítkovice.

Management career
In 2011, he was announced as the new coach of MFK Havířov.

References

1961 births
Living people
Czechoslovak footballers
Czech footballers
Czech First League players
MFK Vítkovice players
Le Havre AC players
Angoulême Charente FC players
Czech football managers
SFC Opava managers
Sportspeople from Karviná
Czechoslovak expatriate footballers
Expatriate footballers in France
Czechoslovak expatriate sportspeople in France
Association football midfielders